The Arden family is an English gentry family that can be traced back in the male line back to Anglo-Saxon landholders who managed to maintain status after the 1066 invasion of England by the Normans of France. The family takes its name from the Forest of Arden in Warwickshire.

It has been claimed that the Ardens are one of only three families in England that can trace its lineage in the male line back to Anglo-Saxon times. The other two are the Berkeley family and the Swinton family). Modern scholars Parry and Enis have noted that the importance which investigations into the ancestry of the Ardens had in the 16th century because of the implications for the powerful Dudley family. They needed to either claim ancestry from Turchil, or that their prestigious ancestors had lied in their claims to descend from him, which were bound up with the famous legend of Guy of Warwick, who was supposed to be an ancestor of Turchil, who was the real ancestor of the Ardens at the time of William the Conqueror. Concerning Turchil Parry and Enis describe him as "the only Saxon magnate to increase his territories after the Norman conquest" and "the largest landholder in Warwickshire at the time of the Domesday survey".

The Ardens have also often been discussed because of their connection to William Shakespeare, whose mother was an Arden.

History
Alwin (Æthelwine) was Sheriff of Warwickshire at the time of the Norman Conquest. He was succeeded by his son, Thorkell of Arden (variously spelled Thorkill, Turchil etc.), whose own son and principal heir, Siward, subsequently married Cecilia, and from this union many Arden families descend. Subsequent generations of the family remained prominent in Warwickshire affairs and on many occasions held the shrievalty. 

In the thirteenth century the main line of the Ardens was descended from Siward's grandson Thomas, and his family was based in Ratby in Warwickshire. The third Thomas de Arden of Ratby was taken prisoner at the Battle of Evesham. By the end of the century this branch of the family no longer existed, but significant lands had been sold to Thomas Arden of Hanwell and his wife Roesia. Another Arden family continued to hold significant lands from their base in Radbourne.

From the time of Sir Henry de Arden in the 14th century the most prominent Ardens had their primary estate at Park Hall, Castle Bromwich. This family were initially based in the old Arden manor of Cudworth in Warwickshire and were descended from Thomas and Roesia. Robert Arden was executed in 1452 for supporting the uprising of Richard, Duke of York. The same fate befell Edward Arden in 1583, who came under suspicion for being head of a family that had remained loyal to the Catholic Church, and was sentenced for allegedly plotting against Elizabeth I. Edward's great-grandson Robert died unmarried and without issue in 1643, bringing the Park Hall male line to an end.

See also
Arden (name)
Arden, Warwickshire
List of monarchs of Mercia
Baron Alvanley, of Alvanley in Cheshire, a title created in 1801 for senior judge Richard Pepper Arden and which passed to his sons in turn then became extinct.

References

English gentry families